The Philippine Independence Day Parade, in New York City, the world's largest outside the Philippines, takes place annually in the United States along Madison Avenue in the Manhattan borough. The parade is held on the first Sunday in June.
Its main purpose is to create awareness of Philippine culture and to raise funds for charity projects in the Philippines and the United States.

Philippine Independence, as a celebration in America, has gained cultural awareness prominently after the 21st century began. Earlier generations of Filipino immigrants did not celebrate Philippine Independence in significant ways. Philippine Independence Day is widely celebrated among Filipinos in the United States and is now a major event for many Filipino Americans to rekindle their roots and heritage.

Many areas where there are significant Filipino American populations in the United States celebrate Philippine Independence in the month of June. The largest among Philippine Independence celebrations in the United States takes place in New York City every first Sunday of June. The Philippine Independence Day Parade in New York City attracts over 100,000 people.

The 2022 Philippine Independence Day Parade in New York City took place on June 5, 2022, at Madison Avenue, following the tradition of the celebration being on the first Sunday of June. There was no parade in 2020 and 2021 as it went on hiatus.

Brief history

Together with the Filipino American community, the Philippine Consulate General in New York created the Philippine Independence Day Committee (PIDC) to commemorate the birth of Philippine Independence.

Established in 1990 during Consul General Hermenegildo Garcia's term, PIDC is an ad hoc committee with a life cycle of one year. All consuls general would later become the honorary overall chairperson for the corresponding year. The position of overall chairperson is elected every year. The winner in the election will then appoint the rest of her/his executive committee.

At first, the theme of each year's celebration is handed down from the Government of the Philippines in Manila. Later on, the overall chairperson chooses the theme for her/his term. The coat of arms of the Republic of the Philippines is the centerpiece of the PIDC logo and PIDC's official address is that of the Philippine Consulate in New York. Checks payable to PIDC are mailed to and received by the Philippine Consulate and handed over to PIDC. All PIDC meetings, with rare exceptions, are conducted at the consulate.

The Philippine Independence Day celebration in the northeastern United States includes not only New York but also the twelve states under the jurisdiction of the Philippine Consulate General in New York, namely, Connecticut, Delaware, Louisiana, Maine, Massachusetts, New Hampshire, New Jersey, Oklahoma, Pennsylvania, Rhode Island and Vermont. Depending on the theme each year, the overall chairperson may expand and invite other areas to participate in PIDC's many activities.

Traditionally held along Madison Avenue from 37th to 25th Streets in Manhattan, the climax of the preparation, the Philippine Independence Day Parade, Street Fair and Cultural Show, held on the first Sunday in June each year is the biggest celebration of Philippine Independence outside the Philippines. The Street Fair and Cultural Show take place on the east side of Madison Square Park. The festivities include a beauty, brains and talent contest that concludes in the Diwa ng Kalayaan (Spirit of Independence) Selection and Coronation Pageant and Gala, Philippine Independence Ball (the culminating festivity of the annual commemoration held on the Saturday after the first Sunday in June), An Evening with the Consul General, the Grand Marshal Gala, other fund raising activities, special cultural presentations and other events that may be initiated by the overall chairperson.

The Philippine Consulate extends its support and guidance to the PIDC from inception to culmination of the annual event. It begins with the sending of invitations to community leaders to a general meeting, election of overall chairperson, and in the planning and execution of activities up to Appreciation Night where the Consul General awards certificates of appreciation to PIDC officers and members.

Since 1993, there were calls for incorporation of PIDC. On September 8, 2001, with the election of the overall chairperson, the members of the Filipino American community were also given the chance to cast their vote on the incorporation of PIDC. Results showed that majority of Filipino Americans are in favor of incorporating PIDC. With paperwork and processing, an incorporated PIDC will take over the reins of the annual commemoration in 2003. Hence, 2002 was PIDC's last year under the auspices of the Consulate General of the Philippines, New York.

The Philippine Independence Day Council, Inc. (PIDCI) was issued its certificate of incorporation on February 14, 2002, and the new corporation took over the planning, organizing, production, execution, direction and presentation of the annual New York commemoration of the anniversary of the declaration of Philippine Independence.  Under the bylaws of PIDCI, the Philippine Consul General in New York remained as an honorary adviser and the commemorations were held "with the cooperation of the Consulate General of the Philippines".

About the parade

The Philippine Independence Day Parade, like any major New York City parades, has a set schedule for its annual celebration. Its usual slot is the first Sunday of June. Since its inception in 1990, the parade has steadily garnered attention not only from the Filipino American community, also from the general population of the New York metropolitan area.

The Philippine Independence Day Council, Inc., which was preceded by the ad-hoc community organization Philippine Independence Day Committee under the auspices of the Consulate General of the Philippines in New York, has been criticized for failing to invite prominent leaders and figures to join the annual event. Also, the council, and the committee before that, has been continuously called on to allow younger Filipinos and Filipino Americans to collaborate in organizing the Philippine Independence Day Parade as opposed to the usual older generation of Filipinos, who are members of the current organizing group. The annual parade also experiences protests from several Philippine civic and political groups.

Other parts of the world

Passaic, Jersey City, New Jersey
Several celebrations dedicated to Philippine Independence are done throughout the world. An example of this would be a smaller annual Philippine Independence Day Parade held in early June in Passaic, New Jersey. This parade is organized by a large Filipino and Filipino-American organization known as the Philippine Day Organizing Council (PDOC).  Another major Philippine parade is held in New Jersey called the Philippine-American Friendship Day Parade in Jersey City, New Jersey, it is held every fourth Sunday of June to celebrate Philippine-American Friendship Day, which is July 4.  The Philippine government declared July 4 every year as Philippine-American Friendship Day after the celebration of Philippine Independence Day was moved from July 4 to June 12.

Toronto, Canada
Toronto hosts an annual Philippine Independence Day Celebration.

British Columbia, Canada
British Columbia celebrates an annual Philippine Days Festival event at the Waterfront Park in North Vancouver. This 2-day festival, attended by some 25,000 Filipino Canadians and other cultural minorities, is usually held on the second weekend of June, and organized by the Metro Vancouver Philippine Arts and Culture Exposition Society (MVPACES). The highlight of the celebration happens on the second day where festivities begin with a flag raising ceremony at the City Hall of North Vancouver, then everyone proceeds to the Waterfront Park where a Park Parade starts the grand opening ceremony. The Royal Canadian Mounted Police (RCMP) escorts the Canadian Flag, while leading Filipino organizations take turn each year to bring in the Philippine flag for the mass singing of the two national anthems. All throughout the 2-day spectacle are stage presentations of traditional Philippine music and dance, a showcase of Filipino talents and entertainment, games, raffle prizes and kid's playland. Filipino cuisine and merchandise fill the park where Filipino Canadian families gather and celebrate. The City and District of North Vancouver play hosts to the event along with the Philippine Consulate General in Vancouver, British Columbia.

San Francisco, California
San Francisco celebrates Philippine Independence Day annually at Union Square. The Philippine flag is raised at the San Francisco City Hall every June 12 as a commemoration of the event and for San Francisco's large Filipino community.

Seattle, Washington
Seattle celebrates Philippine Independence Day through the "Pagdiriwang Festival," held every June at the Seattle Center.

Past issues

Registration and delinquent financial reports
By letter dated April 12, 2006, the Office of the Attorney General of the State of New York (OAG), canceled the Philippine Independence Day Council, Inc.'s (PIDCI) registration to solicit contributions. The OAG's Charities Bureau Registry found that PIDCI had been delinquent in filing annual financial reports for 2003, 2004, and 2005, and gave PIDCI until May 12, 2006, to re-register, file all delinquent reports, pay delinquent fees, and remit a re-registration fee of $150. The PIDCI Presidents for the years in question were Reuben Seguritan, Esq., Rogelio Alama, and Nimia Lacebal, respectively; while the Overall Chairpersons for those years were Nena Kaufman, Lolit Gillberg, and Nimia Lacebal, respectively. The OAG's action may affect PIDCI's fundraising and planning for the 2006 Philippine Independence Day Parade scheduled for June 4.
Days after the OAG's letter, the New Jersey Attorney General's Office ("New Jersey AG") informed PIDCI by letter dated April 26, 2006, that it had to register with the New Jersey AG's Charities Registration & Investigation Unit if PIDCI planned to hold charitable events and solicit funds in New Jersey. The New Jersey AG's Office gave PIDCI until May 11 to comply.

Discrimination against attendees of the 2018 NYC Philippine Independence Day Parade 
New York City rejected a formal complaint of discrimination and found no violation of the City zoning code when attendees of the June 3, 2018, Philippine Independence day parade were cleared from a designated New York City Madison Avenue public plaza on the parade route. The public plaza was then barricaded, patrolled by building security and access denied to the parade crowd. New York City officials, in rejecting the complaints filed by witnesses, offered no explanation why the largely Filipino crowd could not sit or stand in the public plaza which is designated to be open 24 hours for public use.

Past themes
1980 · 
1981 · 
1982 · 
1983 · 
1984 · 
1985 · 
1986 · 
1987 · Paglaya '87 - Magkaisa sa Kaunlaran
1988 · 
1989 · Kasarinlan ng Mamamayan, Kalayaan ng Buong Bayan
1990 · Bayan Muna: Kagalingan at Lakas ng Demokrasya
1991 · Malayang Mamamayan, Maunlad na Bayan
1992 · Tagumpay ng Kalayaan, Katarungan at Kaunlaran
1993 · Tagumpay ng Kalayaan, Katarungan at Kaunlaran
1994 · Ang Pilipino: Maka-Diyos, Maka-Bayan, Maka-Tao
1995 · Ang Galing ng Pilipino: Dakila, Magiting, Nagkakaisa
1996 · Ikarangal Mo ang Pilipino, Magiting ang Lahi Mo
1997 · Diwang Pilipino: Isaisip, Isapuso, Isagawa
1998 · Kalayaan: Kayamanan ng Bayan
1999 · Kalayaan Tungo sa Kaginhawaan
2000 · Isang Pagdiriwang ng Lahing Pilipino
2001 · Katapatan, Kahusayan at Katatagan: Hamon sa Lingkod Bayan
2002 · Bayan Ko, Sagot Ko!
2003 · "Kalayaan 2003: Sa Matatag na Republika, Bayan Ko, Sagot Ko!"
2004 · "Kalayaan 2004: Galing ng Pilipino sa Matatag na Republika"
2005 · "Kalayaan 2005: Isang Pilipinas! Bayan ko, Mahal Ko!"
2006 · "Kalayaan 2006: Pagkakaisa Para sa Matatag na Republika"
2007 · "Kalayaan 2007: Sama-Sama Tayo Tungo sa Pag-asenso"
2008 · "Kalayaan 2008: Republic Service, Tungo sa Ganap na Kalayaan at Kaunlaran"
2009 · "Kalayaan 2009: Kagitingan, Kagalingan at Kasipagan tungo sa Kalayaan"
2010 · "Kalayaan 2010: Tagumpay ng Bayan"
2011 · "Kalayaan 2011: Paninindigan ng Bayan"
2012 · "Kalayaan 2012: Pananagutan ng Bayan Para sa Tuwid na Daan"
2013 · "Kalayaan 2013: Ambangan tungo sa Malawakang Kaunlaran"
2014 · "Kalayaan 2014: Pagsunod sa Yapak ng mga Dakilang Pilipino, tungo sa Malawakan at Permanenteng Pagbababago"
2015 · "Kalayaan 2015: Tagumpay sa Pagbabagong Nasimulan, Abot-Kamay Na Ng Bayan"
2016 · "Kalayaan 2016: Pagkakaisa, Pag-aambagan, Pagsulong"
2017 · "Kalayaan 2017: Pagbabago Sama-Samang Balikatin"
2018 · "Kalayaan 2018: Pagbabagong Ipinaglaban, Alay sa Masaganang Kinabukasan"
2019 · "Kalayaan 2019: Tapang ng Bayan, Malasakit sa Mamamayan"
2020 · "Kalayaan 2020: Tungo sa Bansang Malaya, Nagbabayanihan at Ligtas"
2021 · "Kalayaan 2021: Diwa ng Kalayaan sa Pagkakaisa at Paghilom ng Bayan"
2022 · "Kalayaan 2022: Pagsuong sa Hamon ng Panibagong Bukas"

See also
 Filipinos in the New York City metropolitan region

References

External links
 Philippine Independence Day Parade, Inc.

Culture of New York City
Asian-American culture in New York City
Festivals in New York City
Filipino-American history
Filipino-American culture
Filipino-American culture in New York City
Parades in New York City
Cultural festivals in the United States
Annual events in New York City
Festivals in Manhattan
Fifth Avenue
June events
Tourist attractions in Manhattan
Madison Avenue
Flatiron District
Ethnic groups in New York City
Filipino-American culture in New York (state)